Agathanor (Greek:Αγαθάνωρ) (late 4th century BC) son of Agathon was the Macedonian archpriest of Asclepius, mentioned in the decree of Kalindoia.
 Agathanor son of Thrasycles (c. 250-200 BC) from Beroea, was also a Macedonian priest of Apollo, Asclepius  and Hygieia.

References
Epigraphical Database

4th-century BC Macedonians
3rd-century BC Macedonians
4th-century BC clergy
3rd-century BC clergy
Ancient Macedonian priests